Below is a list of currently available tablet PCs grouped by their width, depth, height, screen size, and appropriate tablet case sizes.

The most popular presently available tablet computers are compared in the following table:

See also
 List of iPad accessories
 Mobile phone case
 List of Unique PC Cases

References

Tablet computers